Debra Byrd (born 19 July 1951, Cleveland, Ohio) is an American vocalist who has worked with Barry Manilow in and after Lady Flash and Bob Dylan, appeared on Broadway, and serves as the head vocal coach for American Idol and Canadian Idol, also singing backup for the contestants. Byrd has helped with vocals on the Hub Television Series "Majors and Minors".

Most recently, she has served as vocal coach for all ten seasons of American Idol, as well as the short-lived American Juniors, and all six seasons of Canadian Idol. In late 2006 she helped judge Military Idol, a singing competition where all contestants are members of the United States Army.

External links
Official site
[ Allmusic entry]

Footnotes

20th-century African-American women singers
American musical theatre actresses
Musicians from Cleveland
Living people
1951 births
21st-century American women